Mark Welser (1558–1614) was a German banker, politician, and astronomer, who engaged in learned correspondence with European intellectuals of his time.  Of particular note is his exchange with Galileo Galilei, regarding sunspots.

Biography 
Welser belonged to a rich family of the old German nobility that had emerged in the city of Augsburg.    His uncle Bartholomeus Welser was one of the originators of the family wealth; with the Fugger family he financed the imperial election of Charles V, whose counselor he became.  He was a commercial leader in Portuguese spices and in the economic growth of Antwerp.  He also had an economic relationship with the French crown. In 1528, Bartholomeus, who had outfitted a fleet to the Americas, took control of the colony of Venezuela, obtaining from the emperor the right to retain ownership of it via an annual payment.  His descendants kept it until 1555, when Spain took control of Venezuela.

At the age of 16, Mark was sent to Padua, where he studied for ten years. He traveled often to France, and stayed in Paris in 1572. He became duumvir of Augsburg in 1611, but was also distinguished for his scholarship and his writings.. He also traveled to Italy, and in 1612 in Rome, he was named a member of the Accademia dei Lincei; the following year, he was elected to the Accademia della Crusca.

Mark was familiar with the Italian language and interested in historical research, and in the study of Greek and Latin authors, whose dissemination he promoted by financing the publishing house "Ad Insignia Pinus". The most important of his many works is his , dealing with the early history of the Bavarians, which was translated into German by the author's brother Paul (died 1620). His collected works, under the title , were collected and published in 1682 with a biography of Mark by C. Arnold.

Controversy regarding sunspots

In late 1611, the Jesuit Christoph Scheiner, a mathematics teacher at Ingolstadt, using the pseudonym Apelles latens post tabulam (Apelles hiding behind the painting), wrote three letters to Welser, claiming the discovery of sunspots.  These, Scheiner held, could not be an alteration of the Sun, which according to Aristotelian doctrine was an incorruptible celestial body, but instead were stars interposed between Earth and the Sun, which by an optical illusion appeared to be on the solar surface.  Welser, a patron of academics and strongly connected with the Jesuits, caused Scheiner's observations to be published, and asked Galileo for an opinion.  Galileo responded to Welser, criticizing  him for diffusing an erroneous theory, which Galileo identified as having Jesuit origin, of three satellites orbiting the Sun.  Scheiner responded, this time openly sustaining his theory with the book De maculis solaribus [...] accuratior disquisitio.  Galileo replied in December 1612 with a third letter to Welser in which he claimed that he, prior to Scheiner, had discovered sunspots. In 1613, under the auspices of the Accademia dei Lincei, Galileo published ''Istoria e dimostrazioni intorno alle macchie solari e loro accidenti'' ("History and demonstration regarding sunspots and their behavior"),  confirming that sunspots were present, disappearing and reforming, on the corruptible surface of the Sun, which with reasonable probability drew them along with its rotation.

Death 
Welser, who suffered from severe gout, died the following year, after going through economic troubles that had disturbed his final years of life.

Notes

References

1558 births
1614 deaths
House of Welser
17th-century German astronomers
German bankers
Members of the Lincean Academy
16th-century German businesspeople
17th-century German businesspeople
17th-century German writers
17th-century German male writers